is a command-line interface client program to transfer files using the SSH File Transfer Protocol (SFTP), which runs inside the encrypted Secure Shell connection.

It provides an interactive interface similar to that of traditional command-line FTP clients.

There are other command-line SFTP clients that use different names, such as lftp, PSFTP and PSCP (from PuTTY package) and WinSCP.

See also
 SSH File Transfer Protocol
 Comparison of SSH servers
 Comparison of SSH clients

References

Command-line software
SSH File Transfer Protocol clients